Frank Geideck (born 2 April 1967) is a German football coach and a former player. He is the assistant manager of Marco Rose at RB Leipzig.

References

External links
 

1967 births
Living people
German footballers
Arminia Bielefeld players
2. Bundesliga players
German football managers
Arminia Bielefeld managers
Sportspeople from Bielefeld
Association football midfielders
Footballers from North Rhine-Westphalia
Borussia Mönchengladbach non-playing staff
Association football coaches